Moschion,, is a physician quoted by Soranus, Andromachus, and Asclepiades Pharmacion, who lived in or before the 1st century. He may be the same person who was called the "Corrector", because though he was one of the followers of Asclepiades of Bithynia, he ventured to controvert his opinions on some points.

A physician of the same name is mentioned also by Soranus, Plutarch, Alexander of Tralles, Aëtius Pliny, and Tertullian.

In Byzantine times, a Latin treatise on gynecology by an otherwise unknown Muscio was translated into Greek; this author came to be wrongly identified with Moschion.

Notes

1st-century Greek physicians